Living with War: "In the Beginning" is a studio album by Neil Young, released in 2006. It is a stripped-down version of Young's 2006 album Living with War.  The original title of this particular CD/DVD release, according to a press release, was called Living with War – Raw.  However, the title changed when the album was finally released.

The album includes first mixes of the live trio recordings, made the day of recording, and was made available via digital download on iTunes on Election Day, November 7, 2006. Also available on iTunes that day were four videos directed by Neil Young of songs from the album: "After The Garden," "Families," "Lookin' for a Leader" and "America the Beautiful."

In a special CD/DVD limited-edition package, available on Reprise Records in stores on December 19, 2006 the set included videos directed by Young of every song on the album. The videos used a wide range of visual sources, both from the Iraq War as well as demonstrations in the United States, and Al Gore's film An Inconvenient Truth.

On the "Raw" version of the album, the sound is straight-from-the-source, captured live in the studio exactly the way it was recorded, without the backing instrumentation and choral accompaniment found on the original release.

Track listing
All songs written by Neil Young, and © 2006, Silver Fiddle Music.

"After the Garden" – 3:25
"Living with War" – 5:08
"The Restless Consumer" – 5:51
"Shock and Awe" – 4:56
"Families" – 2:33
"Flags of Freedom" – 3:45
"Let's Impeach the President" – 4:34
"Lookin' for a Leader" – 4:08
"Roger and Out" – 4:23

Personnel
 Neil Young - guitars, vocal
 Rick Rosas - bass
 Chad Cromwell - drums
 Tom Bray - trumpet

Audio production
 Niko Bolas – producer
 L. A. Johnson – assistant producer
 Mix-down at Redwood Digital with Niko Bolas and second engineer John Hausman
 Mastering by Tim Mulligan at Redwood Digital
 Digital Soundbites- Will Mitchell on "Let's Impeach the President"
 100-voice choir conducted and arranged by Darrell Brown and recorded in one 12-hour session at Capitol recording studios in Los Angeles.

DVD production
Directed by Bernard Shakey
Produced by L.A. Johnson
Executive Producer: Elliot Rabinowitz
Associate Producer: Will Mitchell
Song videos edited by: Toshi Onuki, 
Documentary videos edited by Mark Faulkner, Toshi Onuki
Additional Smoke On-line editing: Treena Loria
Assistant Editor: Ziemowit “Jim” Darski

Animations: Steven Gregory, Canal Street Studios
Animation Sound Design: Hands on Sound
Video Headlines/News Tickers: Neil Young, Will Mitchell

DVD Authoring: Rich Winter
DVD Art Direction: Toshi Onuki, Rich Winter
Graphics Art Direction: Phil Denslow
Graphics Production: Ziemowit “Jim” Darski
Production Assistance: Marcy Gensic, Adam Sturgeon
Video Post Production: Total Media Group

Notes 

2006 albums
Neil Young albums
Reprise Records albums
Albums produced by Larry Johnson (film producer)
Albums produced by Niko Bolas
Albums produced by Neil Young